Tokiko (written: , ,  or  or  or 兎季子) is a feminine Japanese given name. Notable people with the name include:

, Japanese lyricist, poet and translator
, Japanese singer-songwriter and actress
, Japanese cross-country skier
, Japanese banker
, wife of Taira no Kiyomori, Japanese samurai

Fictional characters
, character in the manga series X
Tokiko Tsuji, a character in Corpse Party
, protagonist of the manga series Buso Renkin
Tokiko Mima (巳真 兎季子), the eponymous Key in Key the Metal Idol

See also
Tōkikō, a treatise that describes the Japanese pottery trade with Asia

Japanese feminine given names